The Agriculture & New York State Horse Breeding Development Fund is the public-benefit corporation responsible for administering the New York Sire Stakes.

The Agriculture & New York State Horse Breeding Development Fund was established in 1965  to promote the breeding of horses and the conduct of equine research within New York State. As part of its mission, the fund administers the state's Sire Stake's program, provides assistance to county agricultural societies, and provides annual grants to the statewide 4H program as well as the Zweig Fund for Equine Research. It also administers the Excelsior/State Fair Series races and County Fair Races.

Organization
In 2017, it had operating expenses of $16.27 million and a staff of one person. There is a 5-member board overseeing its operations.

About the New York Sire Stakes
The New York Sire Stakes is New York State's harness racing program specifically designed for New York–bred horses. Pari-mutuel races are held at all of New York State's harness tracks. Additional non-pari-mutuel races are held at participating New York State County Fairs.

Laws of New York, PML

See also

 New York State Thoroughbred Breeding and Development Fund Corporation
 New York Racing Association
 New York Wine/Grape Foundation
 Olympic Regional Development Authority

References

External links
 

Horse racing organizations in the United States
Public benefit corporations in New York (state)